Holi is a popular and significant Hindu festival celebrated as the Festival of Colours, Love and Spring.
It celebrates the eternal and divine love of the god Radha and Krishna.
Additionally, the day also signifies the triumph of good over evil, as it commemorates the victory of Vishnu as Narasimha Narayana over Hiranyakashipu. 
Holi is originated and is predominantly celebrated in the Indian subcontinent but has also spread to other regions of Asia and parts of the Western world through the Indian diaspora.

Holi also celebrates the arrival of Spring in India, the end of winter, and the blossoming of love. It is also an invocation for a good spring harvest season. It lasts for a night and a day, starting on the evening of the Purnima (Full Moon Day) falling in the Hindu calendar month of Phalguna, which falls around the middle of March in the Gregorian calendar.

Names

Holi is also known as Dol Jatra (swing festival") and Bôshonto Utshôb ("spring festival") in Bengal (West Bengal and Bangladesh), Dôl Jātrā in Assam, Phāgu Pūrṇimā in the hilly region of Nepal,  Dola jātra in Odisha, Fagua or Phagua in eastern Uttar Pradesh, western Bihar, and northeastern Jharkhand, Phagwah (Caribbean Hindustani: पगवा) in the Caribbean (namely Trinidad and Tobago, Guyana, and Suriname), and Phagua in Fiji.

The main day of the celebration is known as "Holi", "Rangwali Holi", "Dol Purnima", "Dhuleti", "Dhulandi", "Ukuli", "Manjal Kuli", "Yaosang", "Shigmo", "Phagwah", or "Jajiri".

Description

Holi is a sacred ancient tradition of Hindus, a holiday in many states of India and Nepal with regional holidays in other countries. To many Hindus and some non-Hindus, it is a playful cultural event and an excuse to throw coloured water at friends or strangers in jest. It is also observed broadly in the Indian subcontinent. Holi is celebrated at the end of winter, on the last full moon day of the Hindu luni-solar calendar month marking the spring, making the date vary with the lunar cycle. The date falls typically in March, but sometimes late February of the Gregorian calendar.

The festival has many purposes; most prominently, it celebrates the beginning of Spring. In 17th century literature, it was identified as a festival that celebrated agriculture, commemorated good spring harvests and the fertile land. Hindus believe it is a time of enjoying spring's abundant colours and saying farewell to winter. To many Hindus, Holi festivities mark an occasion to reset and renew ruptured relationships, end conflicts and rid themselves of accumulated emotional impurities from the past.

It also has a religious purpose, symbolically signified by the legend of Holika. The night before Holi, bonfires are lit in a ceremony known as Holika Dahan (burning of Holika) or Little Holi People gather near fires, sing and dance. The next day, Holi, also known as Dhuli in Sanskrit, or Dhulheti, Dhulandi or Dhulendi, is celebrated.

In Northern parts of India, Children and youth spray coloured powder solutions (gulal) at each other, laugh and celebrate, while adults smear dry coloured powder (abir) on each other's faces. Visitors to homes are first teased with colours, then served with Holi delicacies (such as puranpoli, dahi-bada and gujia), desserts and drinks. After playing with colours, and cleaning up, people bathe, put on clean clothes, and visit friends and family.

 Like Holika Dahan, Kama Dahanam is celebrated in some parts of India. The festival of colours in these parts is called Rangapanchami, and occurs on the fifth day after Poornima (full moon).

History

The Holi festival is an ancient Hindu festival with its cultural rituals. Since time immemorial, the festival finds colour in numerous scriptures, such as in works like Jaimini's Purva Mimamsa Sutras and Kathaka-Grhya-Sutras with even detailed descriptions in ancient texts like the Narad Purana and Bhavishyad Purana. The festival of “holikotsav” was also mentioned in the 7th century work, Ratnavali, by King Harsha. It is mentioned in the Puranas, Dasakumara Charita, and by the poet Kālidāsa during the 4th century reign of Chandragupta II. The celebration of Holi is also mentioned in the 7th-century Sanskrit drama Ratnavali. The festival of Holi caught the fascination of European traders and British colonial staff by the 17th century. Various old editions of Oxford English Dictionary mention it, but with varying, phonetically derived spellings: Houly (1687), Hooly (1698), Huli (1789), Hohlee (1809), Hoolee (1825), and Holi in editions published after 1910.

Mythology

Radha Krishna 

In the Braj region of India, where the Hindu deities Radha and Krishna grew up, the festival is celebrated until Rang Panchmi in commemoration of their divine love for each other. The festivities officially usher in spring, with Holi celebrated as a festival of love. Garga Samhita, a puranic work by Sage Garga was the first literature to mention the romantic description of Radha and Krishna playing Holi. There is also a popular symbolic legend behind the festival. In his youth, Krishna despaired whether the fair-skinned Radha would like him because of his dark skin colour. His mother Yashoda, tired of his desperation, asks him to approach Radha and ask her to colour his face in any colour she wanted. This Radha did, and Radha and Krishna became a couple. Ever since, the playful colouring of Radha and Krishna's face has been commemorated as Holi. Beyond India, these legends help to explain the significance of Holi (Phagwah) common in some Caribbean communities of Indian origin such as Guyana, Suriname, and Trinidad and Tobago. It is also celebrated with great fervour in Mauritius, Fiji, and South Africa.

Vishnu 

There is a symbolic legend found in chapter 7 of the Bhagavata Purana  explaining why Holi is celebrated as a festival of triumph of good over evil in the honour of Hindu god Vishnu and his devotee Prahlada. King Hiranyakashipu, the father of Prahlada, was the king of demonic Asuras and had earned a boon that gave him five special powers: he could be killed by neither a human being nor an animal, neither indoors nor outdoors, neither at day nor at night, neither by astra (projectile weapons) nor by any shastra (handheld weapons), and neither on land nor in water or air. Hiranyakashipu grew arrogant, thought he was God, and demanded that everyone worship only him.
Hiranyakashipu's own son, Prahlada, however, remained devoted to Vishnu. This infuriated Hiranyakashipu. He subjected Prahlada to cruel punishments, none of which affected the boy or his resolve to do what he thought was right. Finally, Holika, Prahlada's evil aunt, tricked him into sitting on a pyre with her. Holika was wearing a cloak that made her immune to injury from fire, while Prahlada was not. As the fire spread, the cloak flew from Holika and encased Prahlada, who survived while Holika burned. Vishnu, the god who appears as an avatar to restore Dharma in Hindu beliefs, took the form of Narasimha – half human and half lion (which is neither a human nor an animal), at dusk (when it was neither day nor night), took Hiranyakashyapu at a doorstep (which was neither indoors nor outdoors), placed him on his lap (which was neither land, water nor air), and then eviscerated and killed the king with his lion claws (which were neither a handheld weapon nor a launched weapon).

The Holika bonfire and Holi signifies the celebration of the symbolic victory of good over evil, of Prahlada over Hiranyakashipu, and of the fire that burned Holika.

Kama and Rati 
Among other Hindu traditions such as Shaivism and Shaktism, the legendary significance of Holi is linked to Shiva in yoga and deep meditation. Goddess Parvati wanting to bring back Shiva into the world, seeks help from the Hindu god of love called Kamadeva on Vasant Panchami. The love god shoots arrows at Shiva, the yogi opens his third eye and burns Kama to ashes. This upsets both Kama's wife Rati (Kamadevi) and his own wife Parvati. Rati performs her own meditative asceticism for forty days, upon which Shiva understands, forgives out of compassion and restores the god of love. This return of the god of love, is celebrated on the 40th day after Vasant Panchami festival as Holi. The Kama legend and its significance to Holi has many variant forms, particularly in South India.

Cultural significance

The Holi festival has a cultural significance among various Hindu traditions of the Indian subcontinent. It is the festive day to end and rid oneself of past errors, to end conflicts by meeting others, a day to forget and forgive. People pay or forgive debts, as well as deal anew with those in their lives. Holi also marks the start of spring, an occasion for people to enjoy the changing seasons and make new friends.

Holi is of particular significance in the Braj region, which includes locations traditionally associated with Radha Krishna: Mathura, Vrindavan, Nandgaon,  Barsana and Gokula which become touristic during the season of Holi.

Outside India and Nepal, Holi is observed by Hindus in Bangladesh and Pakistan as well as in countries with large diaspora populations from India around the world. The Holi rituals and customs can vary with local adaptations.

Other Indian religions

The festival has traditionally been also observed by non-Hindus, such as by Jains (Nepal).

In Mughal India, Holi was celebrated with such exuberance that people of all castes could throw colour on the Emperor. According to Sharma (2017), "there are several paintings of Mughal emperors celebrating Holi". Grand celebrations of Holi were held at the Lal Qila, where the festival was also known as Eid-e-gulaabi or Aab-e-Pashi. Mehfils were held throughout the walled city of Delhi with aristocrats and traders alike participating. This changed during the rule of Emperor Aurangzeb. He banned the public celebration of Holi using a Farman issue in November 1665. However, the celebration were later restarted after the death of Emperor Aurangzeb.  Bahadur Shah Zafar himself wrote a song for the festival, while poets such as Amir Khusrau, Ibrahim Raskhan, Nazeer Akbarabadi and Mehjoor Lakhnavi relished it in their writings.

Sikhs have traditionally celebrated the festival, at least through the 19th century, with its historic texts referring to it as Hola. Guru Gobind Singh – the last human guru of the Sikhs – modified Holi with a three-day Hola Mohalla extension festival of martial arts. The extension started the day after the Holi festival in Anandpur Sahib, where Sikh soldiers would train in mock battles, compete in horsemanship, athletics, archery and military exercises.

Holi was observed by Maharaja Ranjit Singh and his Sikh Empire that extended across what are now northern parts of India and Pakistan. According to a report by Tribune India, Sikh court records state that 300 mounds of colours were used in 1837 by Ranjit Singh and his officials in Lahore. Ranjit Singh would celebrate Holi with others in the Bilawal gardens, where decorative tents were set up. In 1837, Sir Henry Fane who was the commander-in-chief of the British Indian army joined the Holi celebrations organised by Ranjit Singh. A mural in the Lahore Fort was sponsored by Ranjit Singh and it showed the Hindu god Krishna playing Holi with gopis. After the death of Ranjit Singh, his Sikh sons and others continued to play Holi every year with colours and lavish festivities. The colonial British officials joined these celebrations.

Celebrations 

Days before the festival, people start gathering wood and combustible materials for the bonfire in parks, community centers, near temples and other open spaces. On top of the pyre is an effigy to signify Holika who tricked Prahalad into the fire. Inside homes, people stock up on pigments, food, party drinks and festive seasonal foods such as gujiya, mathri, malpuas and other regional delicacies.

Holika Dahan 

Holi celebrations start on the night before Holi with the ritual of Holika Dahan or "Chhoti Holi" where people gather and perform religious rituals in front of a bonfire and pray that their internal evils be destroyed the way Holika, the sister of the demon king Hiranyakashipu, was killed in the fire.

On the eve of Holi, typically at or after sunset, the pyre is lit, signifying Holika Dahan. The ritual symbolises the victory of good over evil. People gather around the fire to sing and dance.

Main day 

The next morning is celebrated as Rangwali Holi (Dhuleti) where people smear and drench each other with colours. Water guns and water-filled balloons are often used to play and colour each other, with anyone and any place being considered fair game to color. Groups often carry drums and other musical instruments going from place to place singing and dancing. Throughout the day people visit family, and friends and foes come together to chat, enjoy food and drink, and partake in Holi delicacies.

Traditionally, washable natural plant-derived colours such as turmeric, neem, dhak, and kumkum were used, but water-based commercial pigments are increasingly used nowadays. All colours are used. Everyone in open areas such as, streets and parks is game, but inside homes or at doorways only dry powder is used to smear each other's face. People throw colours and get their targets completely coloured up. It is like a water fight, but with coloured water. People take delight in spraying coloured water on each other. By late morning, everyone looks like a canvas of colours. This is why Holi is given the name "Festival of Colours".

Groups sing and dance, some playing drums and dholak. After each stop of fun and play with colours, people offer gujiya, mathri, malpuas and other traditional delicacies. Cold drinks, including drinks made with marijuana, are also part of the Holi festivity.

Later in the day 
After a day of play with colours, people clean up, wash and bathe, sober up and dress up in the evening and greet friends and relatives by visiting them and exchanging sweets. Holi is also a festival of forgiveness and new starts, which ritually aims to generate harmony in society. Many cities in Uttar Pradesh also organise Kavi Sammelan in the evening.

Variations 

There are several cultural rituals associated with Holi. In the Braj region around Mathura, in north India, the festivities may last more than a week. The rituals go beyond playing with colours, and include a day where men go around with shields and women have the right to playfully beat them on their shields with sticks. It is known as Lathmar Holi, traditionally celebrated in the Barsana. Barsana is the hometown of goddess Radha and there women assume the role of gopikas (Radha's friends) and men as gopas (Krishna's friends).

In southern India, some worship and make offerings to Kamadeva, the god of lust in Indian mythology.

Bihar, Eastern Uttar Pradesh and Jharkhand 
Holi is known as Phaguwa or Fagua in the local Bhojpuri dialect. In this region as well, the legend of Holika is prevalent. On the eve of Phalgun Poornima, people light bonfires. They put dried cow dung cakes, wood of the Araad or Redi tree and Holika tree, grains from the fresh harvest and unwanted wood leaves in the bonfire. At the time of Holika people assemble near the pyre. The eldest member of the gathering or a purohit initiates the lighting. He then smears others with colour as a mark of greeting. Next day the festival is celebrated with colours and a lot of frolic. Traditionally, people also clean their houses to mark the festival.

Holi Milan is also observed in Bihar, where family members and well-wishers visit each other's family, apply colours (abeer) on each other's faces, and on feet, if elderly. Usually, this takes place on the evening of Holi, day after Holi with wet colours is played in the morning through the afternoon. Due to large-scale internal migration issues faced by the people, recently, this tradition has slowly begun to transform, and it is common to have Holi Milan on an entirely different day either before or after the actual day of Holi.

Children and youths take extreme delight in the festival. Though the festival is usually celebrated with colours, in some places, people also enjoy celebrating Holi with water solutions of mud or clay. Folk songs are sung at high pitch and people dance to the sound of the dholak (a two-headed hand-drum) and the spirit of Holi. Intoxicating bhang, made from cannabis, milk and spices, is consumed with a variety of mouth-watering delicacies, such as pakoras and thandai, to enhance the mood of the festival.

In the Kanpur area, Holi lasts seven days with colour. On the last day, a grand fair called Ganga Mela or the Holi Mela is celebrated. This Mela (fair) was started by freedom fighters who fought British rule in the First Indian War of Independence in 1857 under the leadership of Nana Saheb. The Mela is held at various ghats along the banks of the River Ganga in Kanpur, to celebrate the Hindus and Muslims who together resisted the British forces in the city in 1857. On the eve of Ganga Mela, all government offices, shops, and courts generally remain closed. The Ganga Mela marks the official end of "The Festival of Colours" or Holi in Kanpur.

In Gorakhpur, the northeast district of Uttar Pradesh, the day of Holi starts with a special puja. This day, called "Holi Milan", is considered to be the most colourful day of the year, promoting brotherhood among the people.  People visit every house and sing Holi songs and express their gratitude by applying coloured powder (Abeer).

Goa 

Holi is locally called Ukkuli in Konkani. It is celebrated around the Konkani temple called Gosripuram temple. It is a part of the Goan or Konkani spring festival known as Śigmo or शिगमो in Koṅkaṇī or Śiśirotsava, which lasts for about a month. The colour festival or Holi is a part of longer, more extensive spring festival celebrations. Holi festivities (but not Śigmo festivities) include: Holika Puja and Dahan, Dhulvad or Dhuli vandan, Haldune or offering yellow and saffron colour or Gulal to the deity.

Gujarat 

In Gujarat, Holi is a two-day festival. On the evening of the first day, a bonfire is lit and raw coconut and corn is offered to the fire. The second day is the festival of colour or "Dhuleti", celebrated by sprinkling coloured water and applying colours to each other. Dwarka, a coastal city of Gujarat, celebrates Holi at the Dwarkadhish temple with citywide music festivities.  Holi marks the agricultural season of the rabi crop.

In some places, there is a custom in undivided Hindu families that the woman beats her brother-in-law with a sari rolled up into a rope in a mock rage and tries to drench him with colours, and in turn, the brother-in-law brings sweets (Indian desserts) to her in the evening.

Jammu and Kashmir 
In Jammu and Kashmir, Holi celebrations are much in line with the general definition of Holi celebrations: a high-spirited festival to mark the beginning of the harvesting of the summer crop, with the throwing of coloured water and powder and singing and dancing.

Karnataka 
Traditionally, in rural Karnataka, children collect money and wood in the weeks prior to Holi, and on "Kamadahana" night, all the wood is put together and lit. The festival is celebrated for two days. People in northern parts of Karnataka prepare special food on this day.

In Sirsi, Karnataka, Holi is celebrated with a unique folk dance called "Bedara Vesha", which is performed during the nights beginning five days before the actual festival day. The festival is celebrated every alternate year in the town, which attracts a large number of tourists from different parts of India.

Maharashtra 
In Maharashtra, Holi Purnima is also celebrated as Shimga, festivities that last five to seven days. A week before the festival, youngsters go around the community, collecting firewood and money. On the day of Shimga, the firewood is heaped into a huge pile in each neighbourhood. In the evening, the fire is lit. Every household brings a meal and dessert, in the honour of the fire god. Puran Poli is the main delicacy and children shout "Holi re Holi puranachi poli". Shimga celebrates the elimination of all evil. The colour celebrations here take place on the day of Rang Panchami, five days after Shimga. During this festival, people are supposed to forget and forgive any rivalries and start new healthy relations with all.

Manipur 
Manipuris celebrate Holi for 6 days. Here, this holiday merges with the festival of Yaosang. Traditionally, the festival commences with the burning of a thatched hut of hay and twigs. Young children go from house to house to collect money, locally known as nakadeng (or nakatheng), as gifts on the first two days. The youths at night perform a group folk dance called Thabal chongba on the full moon night of Lamta (Phalgun), traditionally accompanied by folk songs and rhythmic beats of the indigenous drum, but nowadays by modern bands and fluorescent lamps. In Krishna temples, devotees sing devotional songs, perform dances and celebrate with aber (gulal) wearing traditional white and yellow turbans. On the last day of the festival, large processions are taken out to the main Krishna temple near Imphal where several cultural activities are held. In recent decades, Yaosang, a type of Indian sport, has become common in many places of the valley, where people of all ages come out to participate in a number of sports that are somewhat altered for the holiday.

Odisha 

The people of Odisha celebrate Dola or Pushpadola on the day of Holi where the icons of Jagannath replace the icons of Krishna and Radha. Dola Melana, processions of the deities are celebrated in villages and bhoga is offered to the deities. "Dola yatra" was prevalent even before 1560 much before Holi was started where the idols of Jagannath, Balabhadra and Subhadra used to be taken to the "Dolamandapa" (podium in Jagannath temple). People used to offer natural colours known as "abira" to the deities and apply on each other's feats.

Punjab 
In Punjab, the eight days preceding Holi are known as luhatak. Sekhon (2000) states that people start throwing colours many days before Holi.

Holi is preceded by Holika Dahan the night before when a fire is lit. Historically, the Lubana community of Punjab celebrated holi "with great pomp and show. The Lubanas buried a pice and betel nut. They heaped up cow-dung cakes over the spot and made a large fire. When the fire had burnt out, they proceeded to hunt for the pice and betel-nut. Whosoever found these, was considered very lucky." Elsewhere in Punjab, Holi was also associated with making fools of others. Bose writing in Cultural Anthropology: And Other Essays in 1929 noted that "the custom of playing Holi-fools is prevalent in Punjab".

On the day of Holi, people engage in throwing colours on each other. For locals, Holi marks the end of winter. The Punjabi saying Phaggan phal laggan (Phagun is the month for fructifying) exemplifies the seasonal aspect of Holi. Trees and plants start blossoming from the day of Basant and start bearing fruit by Holi.

During Holi in Punjab, walls and courtyards of rural houses are enhanced with drawings and paintings similar to rangoli in South India, mandana in Rajasthan, and rural arts in other parts of India. This art is known as chowk-poorana or chowkpurana in Punjab and is given shape by the peasant women of the state. In courtyards, this art is drawn using a piece of cloth. The art includes drawing tree motifs, flowers, ferns, creepers, plants, peacocks, palanquins, geometric patterns along with vertical, horizontal and oblique lines. These arts add to the festive atmosphere.

Folk theatrical performances known as swang or nautanki take place during Holi, with the latter originating in the Punjab. According to Self (1993), Holi fairs are held in the Punjab which may go on for many days. Bose (1961) states that "in some parts of Punjab, Holi is celebrated with wrestling matches".

Tamil Nadu 
In Tamil Nadu, it is celebrated as the Panguni Uthiram festival that signifies the blossoming of love and marriage. Rati and Kamadeva are worshipped in many parts. Temples also celebrate the marriages of Parvati and Parameswara, Murugan and Deivanai, Kodhai Aandaal and Rangamannar on this day. In the Sarangapani temple in Kumbakonam, Narayana marries Komalavalli Naachiyar and gave Kalyana Kola Seva to his Bhakthas on this day. Valmiki's Ramayana says it is on this day that Sita's marriage with Rama was celebrated. Devotees throng to temples to witness the divine wedding ceremonies. It is also an auspicious date for engagements and weddings to finalise. From Brahmanda Puranam, it is said that on this Panguni Uthiram, all holy waters join the seven sacred tanks in Tirupati Tirumala.

Telangana 
Holi is called as Kamuni Punnami/Kama Purnima or Jajiri in Telugu. Hindus celebrate Holi as it relates to the legend of Kamadeva. Holi is also known by different names: Kamavilas, Kamuni Panduga and Kama-Dahanam.

It  is a 10-day festival in Telangana, of which last two days are of great importance. As in other parts of India, in rural Telangana, the 9 days preceding Holi, children celebrate kamuda by playing Kolata sticks along with singing folk songs called jajiri and collect money, rice, corn and wood. For this reason Holi is well known for "Jajiri Paatalu Kamudi aatalu", which means festival of "Jajiri songs and Kamudi games" and on 9th night i.e. Holy eve, all the wood is put together and set on fire representing Kama Dahanam. 

Next morning i.e. 10th day is celebrated as Holi, with colours traditionally extracted from Moduga/Gogu Flowers (Palash/Butea monosperma).

Tripura 
In Tripura Holi is known as "Pali" which means colour in Tripuri language, it's celebrated all over Tripura.

Western Uttar Pradesh 

Barsana, a town near Mathura in the Braj region of Uttar Pradesh, celebrates Lathmar Holi in the sprawling compound of the Radha Rani temple. Thousands gather to witness the Lath Mar Holi when women beat up men with sticks as those on the sidelines become hysterical, sing Holi songs and shout "Radhe Radhe" or "Sri Radhe Krishna". The Holi songs of Braj Mandal are sung in pure Braj, the local language. Holi celebrated at Barsana is unique in the sense that here women chase men away with sticks. Males also sing provocative songs in a bid to invite the attention of women. Women then go on the offensive and use long staves called lathis to beat the men, who protect themselves with shields.

Mathura, in the Braj region, is the birthplace of Krishna. In Vrindavan this day is celebrated with special puja and the traditional custom of worshipping Radha Krishna; here the festival lasts for sixteen days. All over the Braj region and neighbouring places like Hathras, Aligarh, and Agra, Holi is celebrated in more or less the same way as in Mathura, Vrindavan and Barsana.

A traditional celebration includes Matki Phod, similar to Dahi Handi in Maharashtra and Gujarat during Krishna Janmashtami, both in the memory of god Krishna who is also called makhan chor (literally, butter thief). This is a historic tradition of the Braj region as well as the western region of India. An earthen pot filled with butter or other milk products is hung high by a rope. Groups of boys and men climb on each other's shoulders to form pyramids to reach and break it, while girls and women sing songs and throw coloured water on the pyramid to distract them and make their job harder. This ritual sport continues in Hindu diaspora communities.

Uttarakhand 

Kumaoni Holi in Uttarakhand includes a musical affair. It takes different forms such as the Baithki Holi, the Khari Holi and the Mahila Holi. In Baithki Holi and Khari Holi, people sing songs with a touch of melody, fun, and spiritualism. These songs are essentially based on classical ragas. Baithki Holi (बैठकी होली), also known as Nirvan Ki Holi, begins from the premises of temples, where Holiyars (होल्यार) sing Holi songs and people gather to participate, along with playing classical music. The songs are sung in a particular sequence depending on the time of day; for instance, at noon the songs are based on Peelu, Bhimpalasi and Sarang ragas, while evening songs are based on the ragas such as Kalyan, Shyamkalyan and Yaman. The Khari Holi (खड़ी होली) is mostly celebrated in the rural areas of Kumaon. The songs of the Khari Holi are sung by the people, who, sporting traditional white churidar payajama and kurta, dance in groups to the tune of ethnic musical instruments such as the dhol and hurka.

In the Kumaon region, the Holika pyre, known as Cheer (चीर), is ceremonially built in a ceremony known as Cheer Bandhan (चीर बंधन) fifteen days before Dulhendi. The Cheer is a bonfire with a green Paiya tree branch in the middle. The Cheer of every village and neighbourhood is rigorously guarded as rival mohallas try to playfully steal each other's cheer.

The colours used on Holi are derived from natural sources. Dulhendi, known as Charadi (छरड़ी) (from Chharad (छरड़)), is made from flower extracts, ash and water. Holi is celebrated with great gusto much in the same way all across North India.

West Bengal 

In West Bengal, Holi is known by the name of "Dol Jatra", "Dol Purnima" or the "Swing Festival". In Shantiniketan, West Bengal, Holi is known as “Basanta Utsav”. The festival is celebrated in a dignified manner by placing the icons of Radha and Krishna on a picturesquely decorated palanquin which is then taken round the main streets of the city or the village. On the Dol Purnima day in the early morning, students (mainly in Shantiniketan) dress up in saffron-coloured or pure white clothes and wear garlands of fragrant flowers. They sing and dance to the accompaniment of musical instruments, such as the ektara, dubri, and veena. The devotees take turns to swing them while women dance around the swing and sing songs. During these activities, the people keep throwing coloured water and dry colours, abir, at them.

Around 500 years ago, Sri Chaitanya Mahaprabhu went to Vrindaban in present day Uttar Pradesh to witness the festival there at the birthplace of Lord Sri Krishna. After his return to Bengal, he thought of starting the festival here. So he asked his followers to smear color or abir to Lord Krishna's idol and then put that abir on each other. He also instructed them to give the other person a treat with a local sweet called malpoa. The biographies of Sri Chaitanya say that he was very fond of this sweet.

Nepal 

Holi, also known as Phagu Purnima, along with many other Hindu festivals, is celebrated in Nepal as a national festival. It is an important major Nepal-wide festival along with Dashain and Tihar (Dipawali). It is celebrated in the Nepali month of Falgun (Terai region celebrates on the same date as Indian Holi, while rest of the country celebrates it a day earlier), and signifies the legends of the Hindu god Krishna. They worship Saraswati shrine in Vajrayogini temples and celebrate the festival with their Hindu friends.

Traditional concerts are held in most cities in Nepal, including Kathmandu, Narayangarh, Pokhara, Itahari, Hetauda, and Dharan, and are broadcast on television with various celebrity guests.

People walk through their neighbourhoods to celebrate Holi by exchanging colours and spraying coloured water on one another. A popular activity is the throwing of water balloons at one another, sometimes called lola (meaning water balloon). Many people mix bhang (made from cannabis, milk and spices) in their drinks and food, as is also done during Shivaratri. It is believed that the combination of different colours at this festival takes all sorrow away and makes life itself more colourful.

Pakistan 

Holi is celebrated by the minority Hindu population in Pakistan. Community events by Hindus have been reported by Pakistani media in various cities such as Karachi, Hazara, Rawalpindi, Sindh, Hyderabad, Multan and Lahore. The Hindu tribes of Cholistan in the Punjab province of Pakistan play the game called Khido in the days leading up to the Holi. The game Khido is considered sacred by them as it is believed that Parhlad used to play this game during his childhood.

Holi was not a public holiday in Pakistan from 1947 to 2016. Holi along with Diwali for Hindus, and Easter for Christians, was adopted as public holiday resolution by Pakistan's parliament in 2016, giving the local governments and public institutions the right to declare Holi as a holiday and grant leave for its minority communities, for the first time. This decision has been controversial, with some Pakistanis welcoming the decision, while others criticising it, with the concern that declaring Holi a public holiday advertises a Hindu festival to Pakistani children.

Indian diaspora 

Over the years, Holi has become an important festival in many regions wherever Indian diaspora were either taken as indentured labourers during colonial era, or where they emigrated on their own, and are now present in large numbers such as in Africa, North America, Europe, Latin America, and parts of Asia such as Fiji.

Suriname 
Holi is a national holiday in Suriname. It is called Phagwa festival, and is celebrated to mark the beginning of spring and Hindu mythology. In Suriname, Holi Phagwa is a festival of colour. It is customary to wear old white clothes on this day, be prepared to get them dirty and join in the colour throwing excitement and party.

Trinidad and Tobago 
Phagwa is celebrated with a lot of colour and splendour, along with the singing on traditional Phagwah songs such as Chowtal and new songs such as Pichakaree. Holika Dahan is celebrated the night before Phagwah.

Guyana 
Phagwah is a public holiday in Guyana, and peoples of all races and religions participate in the celebrations. The main celebration in Georgetown is held at the Mandir in Prashad Nagar.

Fiji 
Indo-Fijians celebrate Holi or Pagua as its called in Fiji Hindi, as the festival of colours, folksongs, and dances. The folksongs sung in Fiji during Holi season are called phaag gaaian. Phagan, also written as Phalgan, is the last month of the Hindu calendar. Holi is celebrated on the full moon of Phagan. Holi marks the advent of spring and ripening of crops in Northern India. Not only it is a season of romance and excitement, folk songs and dances, it is also an occasion of playing with powder, perfumes, and colours. Many of the Holi songs in Fiji are around the theme of love-relationship between Radha and Krishna.

Mauritius 
Holi in Mauritius comes close on the heels of Shivaratri. It celebrates the beginning of spring, commemorating good harvests and the fertile land. Hindus believe it is a time of enjoying spring's abundant colours and saying farewell to winter. It is considered one of the most exhilarating religious holidays in existence. During this event, participants hold a bonfire, throw coloured powder at each other, and celebrate wildly.

United States 

Holi is celebrated in many US states by mainly Asian Americans, particularly those with Indian ancestry. It is usually hosted in Hindu temples or cultural halls. Members of Hindu associations and volunteers assist in hosting the event along with temple devotees. Some of the places known to celebrate Holi are New Brunswick (NJ), Spanish Fork (Utah), Houston (TX), Dallas (TX), South El Monte (CA), Milpitas (CA), Mountain House (CA), Tracy (CA), Lathrop (CA), Boston (MA), Potomac (MD), and Chicago (IL).

Indonesia 
In Indonesia, Indian Indonesians and Balinese Hindu people celebrate Holi as festival of colours. The main celebrations are in Medan and Bali.

Sometimes the Indian immigrants from other countries may also celebrate a small-scale version of Holi.

Holi colours

Traditional sources of colours 
The spring season, during which the weather changes, is believed to cause viral fever and cold. The playful throwing of natural coloured powders, called gulal has a medicinal significance: the colours are traditionally made of neem, kumkum, haldi, bilva, and other medicinal herbs suggested by Āyurvedic doctors.

Many colours are obtained by mixing primary colours. Artisans produce and sell many of the colours from natural sources in dry powder form, in weeks and months preceding Holi. Some of the traditional natural plant-based sources of colours are:

Orange and red 
The flowers of palash or tesu tree, also called the flame of the forest, are typical source of bright red and deep orange colours. Powdered fragrant red sandalwood, dried hibiscus flowers, madder tree, radish, and pomegranate are alternate sources and shades of red. Mixing lime with turmeric powder creates an alternate source of orange powder, as does boiling saffron (kesar) in water.

Green 
Mehendi and dried leaves of gulmohur tree offer a source of green colour. In some areas, the leaves of spring crops and herbs have been used as a source of green pigment.

Yellow 

Haldi (turmeric) powder is the typical source of yellow colour. Sometimes this is mixed with chickpea (gram) or other flour to get the right shade. Bael fruit, amaltas, species of chrysanthemums, and species of marigold are alternate sources of yellow.

Blue 
Indigo plant, Indian berries, species of grapes, blue hibiscus, and jacaranda flowers are traditional sources of blue colour for Holi.

Magenta and purple 
Beetroot is the traditional source of magenta and purple colour. Often these are directly boiled in water to prepare coloured water.

Brown 
Dried tea leaves offer a source of brown coloured water. Certain clays are alternate source of brown.

Black 
Species of grapes, fruits of amla (gooseberry) and vegetable carbon (charcoal) offer grey to black colours.

Application
During traditional Holi celebrations in India, Rinehart writes, colours are exchanged in person by "tenderly applying coloured powder to another person's cheek", or by spraying and dousing others with buckets of coloured water.

Issues

Health impact 
A 2007 study found that malachite green, a synthetic bluish-green dye used in some colours during Holi festival, was responsible for severe eye irritation in Delhi, if eyes were not washed upon exposure. Though the study found that the pigment did not penetrate through the cornea, malachite green is of concern and needs further study.

Another 2009 study reports that some colours produced and sold in India contain metal-based industrial dyes, causing an increase in skin problems to some people in the days following Holi. These colours are produced in India, particularly by small informal businesses, without any quality checks and are sold freely in the market. The colours are sold without labelling, and the consumer lacks information about the source of the colours, their contents, and possible toxic effects. In recent years, several non-governmental organisations have started campaigning for safe practices related to the use of colours. Some are producing and marketing ranges of safer colours derived from natural sources such as vegetables and flowers.

These reports have galvanised a number of groups into promoting more natural celebrations of Holi. Development Alternatives, Delhi's CLEAN India campaign, Kalpavriksh Environment Action Group, Pune, Society for Child Development through its Avacayam Cooperative Campaign have launched campaigns to help children learn to make their own colours for Holi from safer, natural ingredients. Meanwhile, some commercial companies such as the National Botanical Research Institute have begun to market "herbal" dyes, though these are substantially more expensive than the dangerous alternatives. However, it may be noted that many parts of rural India have always resorted to natural colours (and other parts of festivities more than colours) due to availability.

In urban areas, some people wear nose masks and sunglasses to avoid inhaling pigments and to prevent chemical exposure to eyes.

Environmental impact
An alleged environmental issue related to the celebration of Holi is the traditional Holika bonfire, which is believed to contribute to deforestation. Activists estimate Holika 30,000 bonfires every year during Holi, with each one burning approximately 100 kilograms (220.46 lbs) of wood. This represents less than 0.0001% of 350 million tons of wood India consumes every year, as one of the traditional fuels for cooking and other uses.

The use of heavy metal-based pigments during Holi is also reported to cause temporary wastewater pollution, with the water systems recovering to pre-festival levels within 5 days.

Influence on other cultures

Holi is celebrated as a social event in parts of the United States. For example, at Sri Sri Radha Krishna Temple in Spanish Fork, Utah, NYC Holi Hai in Manhattan, New York and Festival of Colors: Holi NYC in New York City, New York,

Holi-inspired events
A number of Holi-inspired social events have also surfaced, particularly in Europe and the United States, often organised by companies as for-profit or charity events with paid admission, and with varying scheduling that does not coincide with the actual Holi festival. These have included Holi-inspired music festivals such as the Festival Of Colours Tour and Holi One (which feature timed throws of Holi powder), and 5K run franchises such as The Color Run, Holi Run and Color Me Rad, in which participants are doused with the powder at per-kilometre checkpoints. The BiH Color Festival is a Holi-inspired electronic music festival held annually in Brčko, Bosnia and Herzegovina. In recent years, schools across Australia have also adopted Holi inspired fund raising activites which leverage fundraising platforms such as Australian Fundraising, School Fun Run and Colour Frenzy to conduct such events.

There have been concerns that these events appropriate and trivialise aspects of Holi for commercial gain—downplaying or completely ignoring the cultural and spiritual roots of the celebration. Organisers of these events have argued that the costs are to cover various key aspects of their events, such as safe colour powders, safety and security, and entertainment.

See also

 Diwali
 Lathmar Holi

 
  
 , famous for ritualised public water fights

Notes

References

External links

 
 Braj ki Holi 2023 Schedule

Holi
Hindu festivals
Bengali festivals
Punjabi festivals
Hindu festivals in India
Spring festivals
Religious festivals in India
Hindu festivals in Nepal
Public holidays in Nepal
Traditions involving fire
Public holidays in Suriname
Festivals in Jharkhand
Nagpuri culture
Festivals in Assam